The first newspaper in the United Arab Emirates was published in 1970. In 2009 there were 13 daily newspapers in the country.

Newspapers in the United Arab Emirates

English language

 Gulf News (India, Dubai)
 GCC Business News (Dubai)

Khaleej Times (India, Dubai)
7days (Dubai)
247 City News (Dubai)
Dubai Standard (Dubai)
Emirates Business 24/7 (Dubai)

 The Arabian Post (Dubai)
 Emirati Times
Khaleej Mag
Gulf Today (Sharjah)
The National (Abu Dhabi)
Sport360 (Dubai)
XPRESS (Dubai)

Arabic language
Al Khaleej (Sharjah)
Akhbar Al Arab (Abu Dhabi)
Al Bayan (Dubai)
 Al Fajr (Abu Dhabi)
Al-Ittihad (Al Waseet) (Abu Dhabi)
Emarat Al Youm (Dubai)
Araa News (Ajman)

Malayalam  

Gulf Madhyamam Daily (Dubai)
Middle East Chandrika Daily (Dubai)
Manorama  Daily (Dubai)
Mathrubhumi Daily (Dubai)
Siraj Daily (Dubai)
Gulf Malayaly

TAMIL language
DAILYTHANTHI (DINATHANTHI) Daily (Dubai)

Chinese language
Nihao Newspaper (Dubai)

Russian language
Komsomolskaya Pravda (Dubai)

Spanish language
El Correo del Golfo (Dubai)

English-Filipino language
The Filipino Times (Abu Dhabi/Dubai)
Kabayan Weekly (Dubai and Northern Emirates/Abu Dhabi)

References

Further reading

External links
 
 
 

 

United Arab Emirates
Newspapers